The Kraków Fire of 1850 started on 18 July and lasted several days. It is estimated to have destroyed about 10 percent of the city of Kraków, which was then part of the Austrian Empire's district of the Grand Duchy.

Background
In 1850 the city of Kraków was still heavily reliant on wood as construction material. Most of the 1700 buildings in the city were wooden, and the masonry ones had many wooden elements. The city had poor water infrastructure, and no full-time fire service.

The fire
The fire started on 18 July on city outskirts around the Krupnicza Street, in the grain mill area. The fire is attributed to an accident caused by a miller and a smith, who while fixing some equipment started a fire in a mill building which then spiraled out of control. The fire grew due to strong winds which spread it to nearby buildings, affecting the city center. Within hours it affected over eight streets, though it was stopped from spreading further. Jagiellonian University students prevented it from causing more than superficial damage to the university's library. The spread of the fire was stopped within one day, but it took several more days and military's assistance to eliminate it completely.

The fire caused the destruction of approximately one tenth of the city: 153 buildings, two palaces, two or three monasteries, and four churches.

Aftermath
The fire was responsible for subsequent economic stagnation in the city. The fire also made the city government increase the fire fighting budget, though the first (voluntary) fire service would not be established until 1865. Final restoration of all affected buildings was finished only in 1912.

Destroyed or damaged landmarks
Bishop's Palace, Kraków
Wielopolski Palace
Church of St. Francis of Assisi, Kraków
Basilica of Holy Trinity, Kraków

References

1850 in the Austrian Empire
1850s in Poland
1850 fires in Europe
History of Kraków
Fires in Poland
Fires in Austria
Urban fires in Europe
1850 disasters in Europe
19th-century disasters in Poland